Ilevniki is a rural locality (a village) in Gorod Vyazniki, Vyaznikovsky District, Vladimir Oblast, Russia. The population was 23 as of 2010.

Geography 
Ilevniki is located 11 km southeast of Vyazniki (the district's administrative centre) by road. Yar is the nearest rural locality.

References 

Rural localities in Vyaznikovsky District
Vyaznikovsky Uyezd